Kilasu Ostermeyer (born 5 March 1997) is a Thailand-born German badminton player who entered the Thailand national team in 2012, and transferred to Germany national team in 2016.

Achievements

BWF International Challenge/Series (1 title) 
Women's doubles

  BWF International Challenge tournament
  BWF International Series tournament

References

External links 
 

Living people
1997 births
Kilasu Ostermeyer
German people of Thai descent
Kilasu Ostermeyer
Thai expatriate sportspeople in Germany
German female badminton players
Kilasu Ostermeyer